Laima Adlytė–Pakuckienė (born March 9, 1971 in Vilnius, USSR) is a Lithuanian player in the International draughts. Many times champion of Lithuania in International draughts. International Master (MIF). She train by Lithuanian draughts player Edvardas Bužinskis.

Laima Pakuckienė was third at 2001 Women's World Draughts Championship. At 2013 European Team Championship Lithuanian team was second in rapid.

In 2007 graduated (:lt:Vilniaus Gedimino technikos universiteto Mechanikos fakultetas). Work by disainer at General Jonas Žemaitis Military Academy of Lithuania.

World Championship
 2001 (3 place)
 2013 (11 place) and 4 place in blitz.
 2015 (11 place)

References

External links
Pfofile, FMJD
Pfofile, KNDB
Laima Adlytė in Lithuanian sports encyclopaedia.

1971 births
Living people
Lithuanian draughts players
Players of international draughts